The orders, decorations, and medals of Brunei consist of  (translatable as 'state decorations') and  (literally 'medals of honour'). Both are awarded by the Sultan of Brunei on the basis of merit, especially on the contributions to the country. The investiture of some of the state decorations also include the conferment of titles, whereby they become part of the awardees' personal names in official correspondence or when mentioned in formal media in the country.

The insignia are displayed in the Royal Regalia Museum located in the capital.

Investiture 

The actual investiture involves awardees being given badges in a ceremony by the Sultan or sometimes the Crown Prince upon the Sultan's discretion. The ceremony is traditionally held in Lapau which is a type of ceremonial hall for royal ceremonies in the Bruneian culture. Meanwhile, the state decorations of lower classes as well as medals of honour are conferred by the Sultan or the Crown Prince Al-Muhtadee Billah in other ceremonies on other days, although commonly held in conjunction with the said birthday celebration. They had been traditionally held at the Lapau building in Bandar Seri Begawan's city centre but in recent years they have been held at the Lapau hall within the palace instead to accommodate the growing number of awardees.

Decorations and medals 

The following are the lists of state decorations and medals of honour of Brunei.

State decorations

Medals of honour 

Below is a list of the current medals of honour:

Medals related to national events 

There are also several medals which are awarded in conjunction with certain national events:

Medals for armed forces of Brunei 

The following are the medals of honour specifically for the armed forces of Brunei;

See also 
 List of honours of Brunei awarded to heads of state and royalty

References

External links 
 List of state decorations and medals of hoonour of Brunei Darussalam 
 List of orders and decorations on BRUNEIresources.com website
 Orders, Decorations and Medals of Brunei

Brunei and the Commonwealth of Nations
 
Brunei-related lists